Edward Smith (30 July 1911 – 26 December 1999) was an Australian cricketer. He played twelve first-class matches for Tasmania between 1930 and 1939.

See also
 List of Tasmanian representative cricketers

References

External links
 

1911 births
1999 deaths
Australian cricketers
Tasmania cricketers
Cricketers from Tasmania